Gary George Brokaw (born January 11, 1954) is a retired American basketball player and a basketball coach.

Playing career

Brokaw attended New Brunswick High School. He played collegiately for the University of Notre Dame.

He was selected by the Milwaukee Bucks in the 1st round (18th pick overall) of the 1974 NBA draft.

He played for the Bucks (1974–76), Cleveland Cavaliers (1976–77) and Buffalo Braves (1977–78) in the NBA for 241 games.

NBA career statistics

Regular season

|-
| align="left" | 1974–75
| align="left" | Milwaukee
| 73 || - || 22.5 || .455 || - || .685 || 2.0 || 3.0 || 0.4 || 0.2 || 8.1
|-
| align="left" | 1975–76
| align="left" | Milwaukee
| 75 || - || 19.6 || .457 || - || .700 || 1.7 || 3.3 || 0.5 || 0.2 || 8.4
|-
| align="left" | 1976–77
| align="left" | Milwaukee
| 41 || - || 21.7 || .401 || - || .766 || 1.6 || 2.7 || 0.5 || 0.6 || 8.9
|-
| align="left" | 1976–77
| align="left" | Cleveland
| 39 || - || 15.3 || .467 || - || .707 || 1.5 || 3.0 || 0.4 || 0.3 || 7.2
|-
| align="left" | 1977–78
| align="left" | Buffalo
| 13 || - || 10.0 || .419 || - || .750 || 0.9 || 1.5 || 0.2 || 0.4 || 4.2
|- class="sortbottom"
| style="text-align:center;" colspan="2"| Career
| 241 || - || 19.6 || .446 || - || .713 || 1.7 || 3.0 || 0.4 || 0.3 || 8.0
|}

Playoffs

|-
| align="left" | 1975–76
| align="left" | Milwaukee
| 3 || - || 36.0 || .622 || - || .944 || 3.7 || 8.0 || 1.0 || 1.0 || 21.0
|-
| align="left" | 1976–77
| align="left" | Cleveland
| 3 || - || 14.7 || .474 || - || .333 || 1.3 || 4.0 || 0.7 || 0.3 || 6.7
|- class="sortbottom"
| style="text-align:center;" colspan="2"| Career
| 6 || - || 25.3 || .571 || - || .792 || 2.5 || 6.0 || 0.8 || 0.7 || 13.8
|}

Coaching career

In the 1980s he worked as a head coach for Iona College basketball team and as an assistant coach for Notre Dame under Digger Phelps. He later worked as NBA director of basketball operations (1991–95) and an assistant coach for the Charlotte Bobcats (2004–05), where he was hired to replace Sam Mitchell after Mitchell left the Bobcats to become the head coach for the Toronto Raptors.

Brokaw continues to coach in the Tampa Bay area with the private coaching service, CoachUp.

References

External links

NBA page on Brokaw

1954 births
Living people
All-American college men's basketball players
Basketball coaches from New Jersey
Basketball players from New Jersey
Buffalo Braves players
Charlotte Bobcats assistant coaches
Cleveland Cavaliers players
Iona Gaels men's basketball coaches
Milwaukee Bucks draft picks
Milwaukee Bucks players
Notre Dame Fighting Irish men's basketball players
New Brunswick High School alumni
Parade High School All-Americans (boys' basketball)
Sportspeople from New Brunswick, New Jersey
Shooting guards
American men's basketball players